Utricularia cymbantha is a very small suspended aquatic carnivorous plant that belongs to the genus Utricularia (family Lentibulariaceae). It is an annual plant. Its native distribution includes tropical and South Africa.

See also 
 List of Utricularia species

References 

Carnivorous plants of Africa
Flora of Angola
Flora of Botswana
Flora of Ethiopia
Flora of Madagascar
Flora of Sudan
Flora of Uganda
Flora of Zambia
cymbantha
Taxa named by Daniel Oliver